Ihor Vasylyovych Boychuk (born 10 January 1994) is a professional Ukrainian football midfielder who plays for Ahrobiznes Volochysk.

Career
Boychuk is a product of the Bukovyna Chernivtsi youth sportive school system in his native Chernivtsi.

After playing in the different amateur teams and spent some seasons in the lower Ukrainian professional leagues, he signed a contract with Rukh Lviv in August 2020 and made his debut for this team as a second half-time substituted player in the losing away match against FC Vorskla Poltava on 23 August 2020 in the Ukrainian Premier League.

References

External links
Statistics at UAF website (Ukr)
 

1994 births
Living people
Sportspeople from Chernivtsi
Ukrainian footballers
FC Bukovyna Chernivtsi players
FC Ahrobiznes Volochysk players
FC Rukh Lviv players
Association football midfielders
Ukrainian Premier League players
Ukrainian First League players
Ukrainian Second League players
Sportspeople from Chernivtsi Oblast